Joseph O'Donnell (1891–1963) was an American screenwriter. He worked for a variety of studios on Poverty Row during the 1930s, mainly on westerns.

Filmography

 Public Stenographer (1933)
 The Moth (1934)
 Bulldog Courage (1935)
 Trails of the Wild (1935)
 Timber War (1935)
 Racing Luck (1935)
 Manhattan Butterfly (1935)
 Murder by Television (1935)
 His Fighting Blood (1935)
 Racing Blood (1936)
 Wild Horse Round-Up (1936)
 Ghost Patrol (1936)
 Wildcat Trooper (1936)
 Born to Fight (1936)
 Aces and Eights (1936)
 Border Caballero (1936)
 Phantom Patrol (1936)
 The Traitor (1936)
 Vengeance of Rannah (1936)
 Roarin' Guns (1936)
 Lightnin' Bill Carson (1936)
 The Fighting Texan (1937)
 Rich Relations (1937)
 Young Dynamite (1937)
 Whistling Bullets (1937)
 Anything for a Thrill (1937)
 North of the Rio Grande (1937)
 Thanks for Listening (1937)
 Land of Fighting Men (1938)
 Songs and Bullets (1938)
 Phantom Ranger (1938)
 Reform School (1939)
 The Adventures of the Masked Phantom (1939)
 Port of Hate (1939)
 The Invisible Killer (1939)
 Flaming Lead (1939)
 Straight Shooter (1939)
 While Thousands Cheer (1940)
 Riders of Black Mountain (1940)
 Gun Code (1940)
 Texas Renegades (1940)
 Billy the Kid in Texas (1940)
 Billy the Kid's Gun Justice (1940)
 The Lone Rider Fights Back (1941)
 The Lone Rider in Ghost Town (1941)
 The Lone Rider Rides On (1941)
 Billy the Kid in Santa Fe (1941)
 Billy the Kid Trapped (1942)
 Border Roundup (1942)
 Devil Riders (1943)
 Death Rides the Plains (1943)
 Wolves of the Range (1943)
 Cattle Stampede (1943)
 Wild Horse Rustlers (1943)
 Raiders of Red Gap (1943)
 Law of the Valley (1944)
 Valley of Vengeance (1944)
 Land of the Outlaws (1944)
 Rustlers' Hideout (1944)
 Tucson Raiders (1944)
 Marshal of Reno (1944)
 Frontier Outlaws (1944)
 Border Feud (1947)
 Return of the Lash (1947)
 Check Your Guns (1948)
 Stagecoach Driver (1951)
 Prairie Roundup (1951)
 Nevada Badmen (1951)
 Oklahoma Justice (1951)
 Man from the Black Hills (1952)

References

Bibliography
 Pitts, Michael R. Poverty Row Studios, 1929–1940: An Illustrated History of 55 Independent Film Companies, with a Filmography for Each. McFarland & Company, 2005.

External links

1891 births
1963 deaths
American screenwriters
People from  New York City